This list of fossil arthropods described in 2010 is a list of new taxa of trilobites, fossil insects, crustaceans, arachnids and other fossil arthropods of every kind that have been described during the year 2010. The list only includes taxa at the level of genus or species.

Dinocaridida

Newly named crustaceans

Newly named insects
 A new family of ceraphronoid Hymenopters, Radiophronidae, is published by Ortega-Blanco, Rasnitsyn, and Delclòs.
 A new family, Mendozachoristidae, is published by Brauckmann et al..
 A new family of Moths, Mesokristenseniidae, is published by Huang, Nel and Minet.
 A new order of holometabolous insects, Nakridletia, is published by Vršanský, Ren & Shih.
 A new family of holometabolous insects, Vosilidae, is published by Vršanský, Ren & Shih.
 A new family of Cockroaches, Socialidae, is published by Vršanský.
 A new family of fulgoroid hemipterans, Weiwoboidae, is published by Lin, Szwedo, Huang and Stroiński.

Newly named spiders

Trilobites

Notes

References 

2010 in paleontology